The Emerson Parks House in Ten Sleep, Wyoming is a historic two-story log house built in 1929.  It was listed on the National Register of Historic Places in 2016.

It was home of Emerson Parks (1887-1965) and his wife Ina Miller Parks.

The house was built using the "butt and pass" method of log construction, a kind of false notching, utilizing "D"-shaped milled logs presumably from the local Bighorn Mountains.

References

External links
 Emerson Parks House at the Wyoming State Historic Preservation Office

Houses on the National Register of Historic Places in Wyoming
Log houses in the United States
Houses completed in 1929
Washakie County, Wyoming
1929 establishments in Wyoming